Villino Ida Basile is a former private residence designed in an art nouveau (Liberty) style by Ernesto Basile, and located on Via Siracusa #15 in the city of Palermo, Sicily, Italy.

History
The structure was built in 1904 as his private home by Basile, and named after his wife Ida. Built in three stories, the structure reinterprets the motif of a balcony, common to Sicilian palaces, but here placed in a corner with a floral design to the iron grill. A majolica frieze is utilized on the third floor. Over the elaborate portal is the motto Dispar et Unum (Diverse and Unique). The interior has a small patio-garden. The home now houses the library of the Soprintendenza per i Beni Culturali e Ambientali di Palermo and the Library of the Soprintendenza ai beni librari per la Sicilia Occidentale.

References

Buildings and structures in Palermo
Art Nouveau architecture in Italy